Alan David Lee (born 1955 or 1956) is an Australian actor. His television and film credits include Prisoner, Special Squad, The Cowra Breakout, Murder Call, All Saints, Water Rats, Blue Heelers, McLeod's Daughters and H2O: Just Add Water.

Lee grew up on a farm in Kenya before moving to Australia when he was 7. He graduated from the National Institute of Dramatic Art (NIDA) in 1981.

Works

Film

Television

Stage

References

External links

Australian male actors
Living people
National Institute of Dramatic Art alumni
1955 births